Vincent Scotto (21 April 1874 – 15 November 1952) was a French composer.

Biography

Early life
Vincent Scotto was born on 21 April 1874 in Marseille to Pasquale Scotto d'Aniello and Antonia Intartaglia, from the island of Procida, north of the Gulf of Naples.

Career
He started his career in Marseille in 1906 and later moved to Paris. Over the course of a lifetime, he wrote 4,000 songs as well as 60 operettas. He was friends with Marcel Pagnol and wrote music for his films. Over time, he wrote music for about fifty films in the 1940s and 1950s, and he sometimes appeared in them as an actor.

In 1973, a biographical TV film was broadcast, La Vie rêvée de Vincent Scotto.

Death
He died on 15 November 1952 in Paris.

Legacy

A bust of Vincent Scotto by sculptor André Arbus (1903-1969) can be found facing the Vieux Port in Place aux Huiles, Marseille.
The Square Vincent Scotto in Aix-en-Provence is named for him.

Selected filmography
 The Sweetness of Loving (1930)
 The Adventurer of Tunis (1931)
 Kiss Me (1932)
 To the Polls, Citizens (1932)
 Clochard (1932)
 Bach the Millionaire (1933)
 The Agony of the Eagles (1933)
 Three Sailors (1934)
 Merlusse (1935)
 Marinella (1936)
Bach the Detective (1936)
 Topaze (1936)
 The Kiss of Fire (1937)
 Sarati the Terrible (1937)
 Mirages (1938)
 Monsieur Brotonneau (1939)
 Strange Suzy (1941)
 Domino (1943)
 Song of the Clouds (1946)
 Counter Investigation (1947)
 Woman Without a Past (1948)
 My Aunt from Honfleur (1949)
 When Do You Commit Suicide? (1953)

References

External links 
 Vincent Scotto on data.bnf.fr

1874 births
1952 deaths
Musicians from Marseille
French people of Italian descent
French songwriters
Male songwriters
French film score composers
French operetta composers
French people of Campanian descent
French male film score composers
French male film actors
20th-century French male actors